East Massapequa (formerly known as West Amityville) is a hamlet and census-designated place (CDP) located within the Town of Oyster Bay in Nassau County, on the South Shore of Long Island, in New York, United States. The population was 19,069 at the 2010 census.

History 
The easternmost third of East Massapequa (within the Amityville School District) was previously the hamlet of West Amityville and started utilizing a Massapequa mailing address in 1975.  
 
The name "East Massapequa" reflects the fact that the hamlet is located east of Massapequa and Massapequa Park.

Geography

Demographics

As of the census of 2000, there were 19,565 people, 6,432 households, and 5,107 families residing in the CDP. The population density was 5,592.8 per square mile (2,158.3/km2). There were 6,535 housing units at an average density of 1,868.1/sq mi (720.9/km2). The racial makeup of the CDP was 74.91% White, 12.34% African American, 0.20% Native American, 2.23% Asian, 0.03% Pacific Islander, 2.47% from other races, and 1.90% from two or more races. Hispanic or Latino of any race were 7.49% of the population. Most of East Massapequa’s African American and Hispanic populations live east of Carman Creek in the section served by Amityville school district and formerly known as "West Amityville.”

There were 6,432 households, out of which 36.6% had children under the age of 18 living with them, 64.6% were married couples living together, 11.0% had a female householder with no husband present, and 20.6% were non-families. 16.4% of all households were made up of individuals, and 8.9% had someone living alone who was 65 years of age or older. The average household size was 3.00 and the average family size was 3.37.

In the CDP, the population was spread out, with 25.1% under the age of 18, 6.6% from 18 to 24, 31.1% from 25 to 44, 23.0% from 45 to 64, and 14.2% who were 65 years of age or older. The median age was 38 years. For every 100 females, there were 93.4 males. For every 100 females age 18 and over, there were 88.9 males.

The median income for a household in the CDP was $75,565, and the median income for a family was $83,373. Males had a median income of $56,032 versus $37,885 for females. The per capita income for the CDP was $28,585. About 2.4% of families and 3.4% of the population were below the poverty line, including 2.8% of those under age 18 and 5.5% of those age 65 or over.

Government 
As East Massapequa is an unincorporated hamlet, it is governed through the Town of Oyster Bay.

The hamlet lies in New York's 2nd congressional district.

Education
East Massapequa is located within the boundaries of (and is thus served by) the Amityville Union Free School District, the Farmingdale Union Free School District, and the Massapequa Union Free School District. As such, children who reside within the hamlet and attend public schools go to school in one of these three districts, depending on where they live within East Massapequa.

Notable people 

 Kelvin Mercer – Rapper and producer; Posdnuos in the hip hop group De La Soul.
 A.J. Price – Former NBA basketball player; attended Amityville Memorial High School.

References

Oyster Bay (town), New York
Census-designated places in New York (state)
Hamlets in New York (state)
Census-designated places in Nassau County, New York
Hamlets in Nassau County, New York
Populated coastal places in New York (state)